The 1982 Australian Open was a tennis tournament played on grass courts at the Kooyong Lawn Tennis Club in Melbourne in Victoria in Australia. It was the 71st edition of the Australian Open and was held from Monday 29 November through Monday 13 December 1982.

Seniors

Men's singles

 Johan Kriek defeated  Steve Denton 6–3, 6–3, 6–2
 It was Kriek's 2nd and last career Grand Slam title and his 2nd consecutive Australian Open title.

Women's singles

 Chris Evert defeated  Martina Navratilova 6–3, 2–6, 6–3
 It was Evert-Lloyd's 13th major title and her 1st Australian Open title.

Men's doubles

 John Alexander /  John Fitzgerald defeated  Andy Andrews /  John Sadri 6–4, 7–6 
 It was Alexander's 2nd and last career Grand Slam title and his 2nd Australian Open title. It was Fitzgerald's 1st career Grand Slam title and his only Australian Open title.

Women's doubles

 Martina Navratilova /  Pam Shriver defeated  Claudia Kohde /  Eva Pfaff 6–4, 6–2 
 It was Navratilova's 17th career Grand Slam title and her 3rd Australian Open title. It was Shriver's 3rd career Grand Slam title and her 1st Australian Open title.

Mixed doubles
The competition was not held between 1970 and 1986.

Juniors

Boys' singles
 Mark Kratzmann defeated  Simon Youl 6–3, 7–5

Girls' singles
 Amanda Brown defeated  Pascale Paradis 6–3, 6–4

Prize money

Total prize money for the men's events was $450,000. Total prize money for the women's events was $350,000.

References

External links
 Official website Australian Open

 
 

 
1982 in Australian tennis
November 1982 sports events in Australia
December 1982 sports events in Australia
1982,Australian Open